Vivek Athreya is an Indian film director and screenwriter who works in Telugu cinema. He directed three films, the romantic comedy Mental Madhilo (2017) and the crime comedy Brochevarevarura (2019), and the romcom Ante Sundaraniki (2022).

Early life
Vivek Athreya is from Guntur. Both his parents work in India Post. He is an Electronics Engineering graduate from Sastra University and worked at IBM, Chennai for five years before resigning to pursue a career as film director.

Career
In 2017, Athreya debuted as a director with Mental Madhilo, a romantic comedy produced by Raj Kandukuri of Pelli Choopulu fame. The film stars Sree Vishnu and Nivetha Pethuraj as the main leads.

Athreya's second film Brochevarevarura was praised for the writing and the message the movie has for women. The film stars Nivetha Thomas, Sree Vishnu, Satyadev Kancharana, Nivetha Pethuraj, Rahul Ramakrishna, and Priyadarshi.

Both the films were commercially successful.

His third directorial was Ante Sundaraniki, which co-starred Nani and Nazriya Nazim, released on 10 June 2022, another romantic comedy which tells the story of an inter religious love couple, woven upon lies, which leads into more complex problems. This film also received positive reviews from critics.

Athreya is also a lyricist. He wrote two songs each in Mental Madhilo and Ee Nagaraniki Emaindi (2018).

Filmography

Films

Lyrics
 Mental Madhilo (2017): "Gummadikaya Halwa", "Oohale" and "Manavi Alakincharadate"(Along with  Hasith Goli)
 Ee Nagaraniki Emaindi (2018): "Maarey Kalaley" and "Veediponidhi Okateley"

Awards and nominations

References

External links

Living people
21st-century Indian film directors
1989 births
Telugu film directors
Indian film directors
People from Guntur
People from Andhra Pradesh
IBM employees